Vembukudi is a village in the Papanasam taluk of Thanjavur district, Tamil Nadu, India.

Demographics 

As per the 2001 census, Vembukudi had a total population of 1090 with 555 males and 535 females. The sex ratio was 964. The literacy rate was 39.41.

References 

 

Villages in Thanjavur district